The Campeonato Brasileiro Série A (English: "Brazilian Championship A Series"), commonly referred to as the Brasileirão (English: "Big Brazilian"), and also known as Brasileirão Assaí due to sponsorship with Assaí Atacadista, is a Brazilian professional league for men's football clubs. At the top of the Brazilian football league system, it is the country's primary football competition. Contested by 20 clubs, it operates on a system of promotion and relegation with the Campeonato Brasileiro Série B. In 2021 the competition was chosen by the IFFHS as the strongest national league in South America as well as the strongest in the world.

Due to historical peculiarities and the large geographical size of the country, Brazil has a relatively short history of nationwide football competitions. Only in 1959, with the advancements in civil aviation and air transport and the need to appoint a Brazilian representative to the first edition of the Copa Libertadores was a nationwide tournament created, Taça Brasil. In 1967, the Torneio Rio-São Paulo was expanded to include teams from other states, becoming the Torneio Roberto Gomes Pedrosa, which was also considered a national tournament. The first tournament downright called a national championship was held in 1971, although it was only referred to as "Campeonato Brasileiro" starting in 1989.

In 2010, the champions of national tournaments from 1959 to 1970—Taça Brasil and Torneio Roberto Gomes Pedrosa—have been declared official winners of the Brazilian championship or champions of Brazil (not winners of Brasileirão or Série A) by the Brazilian Football Confederation. The titles of old tournaments, cited in the Brazilian championship history, are equated to the title of Série A, but the tournaments are cataloging with their original name in the statistics (despite being different competitions, they confer the same title).

The Campeonato Brasileiro is one of the strongest leagues in the world; it contains the most club world champions titles, with 10 championships won among six clubs, and the second-most Copa Libertadores titles, with 20 titles won among 10 clubs. The IFFHS ranked the league fourth in strength for the 2001–12 period after the Premier League (England), La Liga (Spain), and Serie A (Italy). The Campeonato Brasileiro is the most-watched football league in the Americas and one of the world's most exposed, broadcast in 155 nations. It is also one of the world's richest championships, ranked as the sixth most valuable with a worth of over US$1.43 billion, generating an annual turnover of over US$1.17 billion in 2012.

Since 1959, a total of 156 clubs have played in the Campeonato Brasileiro. Seventeen clubs have been crowned Brazilian football champions, thirteen of which have won the title more than once. Palmeiras is the most successful club of the Campeonato Brasileiro, having won the competition eleven times, followed by Santos with eight titles, and Corinthians and Flamengo with seven titles each. Santos' Os Santásticos won five consecutive titles between 1961 and 1965, a feat that remains unequalled. The state of São Paulo is the most successful, amassing 32 titles among five clubs.

History

The Taça Brasil was introduced in 1959, and ran until 1968. The Torneio Roberto Gomes Pedrosa was competed for between 1967 and 1970. In 2010 the CBF announced that these were to be regarded as Brazilian championships.

In 1968, the delay in closing the 1968 Taça Brasil made CBD use the Robertão to determine the Libertadores representatives. With the extinction of the Taça Brasil, the Robertão, officially named by CBD as "Taça de Prata" (Silver Cup) remained the top Brazilian championship the following two years.

Following Brazil's third world title at the 1970 FIFA World Cup, president Emílio Médici decided to better organize Brazilian football. In a reunion with the CBD and the club presidents in October 1970, it was decided to create the following year a Brazilian championship contested by twenty teams, inspired by the national tournaments in the European nations. The first edition of the named "Campeonato Nacional" ("National Championship"), was held in 1971. The top division was named "Divisão Extra" (Extra Division), while a newly created second division earned the "Primeira Divisão" (First Division) name.

In 1987, CBF announced it was not able to organize the Brazilian football championship, a mere few weeks before it was scheduled to begin. As a result, the thirteen most popular football clubs in Brazil created a league, The Clube dos 13, to organize a championship of their own. This tournament was called Copa União and was run by the 16 clubs that eventually took part in it (Santa Cruz, Coritiba and Goiás were invited to join). CBF initially stood by the Club of the 13 decision. However, weeks later, with the competition already underway, and under pressure from football clubs excluded from the Copa União, CBF adopted a new set of rules, which considered the Copa União part of a larger tournament, comprising another 16 teams. According to that new set of rules, the Copa União would be dubbed the Green Module of the CBF championship, whereas the other 16 teams would play the Yellow Module. In the end, the first two teams of each Module would play each other to define the national champions and the two teams that would represent Brazil in the Copa Libertadores in 1988. However, that new set of rules was never recognized by the Club of the 13 and largely ignored by most of the Brazilian media, who concentrated their attention in the independent league, eventually won by Clube de Regatas do Flamengo. The eventual final tourney was set to have Sport and Guarani, from the yellow module, and Flamengo and Internacional from the green one. It never materialized, however, as Flamengo and Internacional refused to partake in it. As a result, Sport and Guarani played each other, with the first one winning the Championship for 1987 and both going on to represent Brazil in the Copa Libertadores in 1988. Although Flamengo has attempted to gain ownership of the championship multiple times through the justice system, Sport remains recognized by both CBF and FIFA as 1987 Champions.

In 2010, CBF decided to recognize the champions of both Taça Brasil (1959–68) and Torneio Roberto Gomes Pedrosa (1967–70) as Brazilian Champions, creating some controversy as there was a two-year period when both tournaments were held, thus Palmeiras was awarded two times for winning both in 1967 and both Santos and Botafogo were recognized as champions in 1968 as each tournament was won by one of them.

Competition format

Competition 
There are 20 clubs in the Brasileirão. During the course of a season (from May to December) each club plays the others twice (a double round-robin system), once at their home stadium and once at that of their opponents, for a total of 38 games. Teams receive three points for a win and one point for a draw. No points are awarded for a loss. Teams are ranked by total points, victories, goal difference, and goals scored. At the end of each season, the club with the most points is crowned champion. If points are equal between two or more clubs, the rules are:

If the tie is between more than two clubs not competing for the national title or relegation, then the tie is broken, using the games the clubs have played against each other:
 a) most games won
 b) total goal difference
 c) total goals scored
 d) head-to-head record (with the away goals rule in effect if only two clubs are taken into account)
If the tie is still not broken, the winner will be determined by Fair Play scales.
 e) fewest yellow cards
 f) fewest red cards
If there is a tie for the championship, for relegation, or for qualification to other competitions, the Fair Play scales will not be taken into account; a play-off match at a neutral venue decides rank. Otherwise, a drawing of lots will determine the final positions.

A system of promotion and relegation exists between the Brasileirão and the Série B. The four lowest placed teams in the Brasileirão are relegated to Série B, and the top four teams from the Série B promoted to the Brasileirão.

Qualification for international competitions 

Since 2016, the top six clubs in the Brasileirão qualify for the following Copa Libertadores. The top four clubs directly enter the group stage whilst the fifth and sixth-placed clubs enter in the second round. The number of teams qualifying for the Libertadores may increase depending on who wins the Copa do Brasil, Copa Sudamericana or Copa Libertadores.

Clubs from seventh to twelfth place qualify for the following Copa Sudamericana, although as above the numbers can depend on other competitions.

Champions

Seventeen clubs are officially recognized to have been the Brazilian football champions. In bold those competing in Série A as of 2023 season.

Nomenclature and sponsorship
The Campeonato Brasileiro had its official name changed often before settling on Campeonato Brasileiro in 1989.

The official name was Copa Brasil (Brazil Cup), but it became known as Copa União (Union Cup).

Finances
The Brasileirão had total club revenues of US$1.17 billion in 2012. This makes the Brasileirão the highest revenue football league in the Americas, and the highest outside of Europe's "big five."

The Brasileirão is also one of the world's most valuable football leagues, having a marketing value and worth over US$1.24 billion in 2013. The total worth of every club in the 2013 Brasileirão is US$1.07 billion.

The Brasileirão's television rights were worth over US$610 million in 2012; that accounts for over 57% of Latin America as a whole.

In 2013 Corinthians was the 16th most valuable club in the world, worth over US$358 million. As of 2021, no Brazilian club enters the list of the most valuable football clubs.

Clubs
The following 20 clubs are competing in the Série A during the 2023 season.

a: Unrelegated clubs
b: Clubs that never played outside the top division

Most appearances

Below is the list of clubs that have more appearances in the Campeonato Brasileiro. There are 157 teams that have taken part in 10 Taça Brasil, 4 Torneio Roberto Gomes Pedrosa and 52 Campeonato Brasileiro editions. The teams in bold compete in Série A currently.

 63 seasons: Grêmio, Santos
 60 seasons: Atlético Mineiro, Cruzeiro, Palmeiras
 58 seasons: Botafogo, Flamengo
 57 seasons: Fluminense, Internacional
 56 seasons: São Paulo
 55 seasons: Corinthians
 54 seasons: Vasco da Gama
 50 seasons: Bahia
 47 seasons: Athletico Paranaense
 43 seasons: Goiás
 42 seasons: Coritiba, Sport Recife
 39 seasons: Vitória
 35 seasons: Portuguesa
 34 seasons: Náutico
 29 seasons: Guarani
 27 seasons: Paysandu 
 26 seasons: Ceará
 25 seasons: Fortaleza
 24 seasons: Ponte Preta, Santa Cruz
 19 seasons: América (MG), America (RJ), CSA
 18 seasons: Juventude
 17 seasons: Figueirense
 16 seasons: Desportiva, Nacional (AM), Paraná, Remo
 15 seasons: América (RN)
 14 seasons: ABC
 13 seasons: Atlético Goianiense, Criciúma, Red Bull Bragantino
 12 seasons: Joinville, Rio Branco (ES), Sampaio Corrêa, Sergipe
 11 seasons: Avaí, Bangu, Campinense, CRB, Moto Club
 10 seasons: Operário (MS)
 9 seasons: Chapecoense, Treze, Vila Nova
 8 seasons: Americano, Confiança, Mixto, Ríver
 7 seasons: Botafogo (PB), Brasília, Flamengo (PI), Inter de Limeira, Londrina, Rio Negro (AM), São Caetano
 6 seasons: Botafogo (SP), Comercial (MS), Ferroviário (CE), Gama, Goytacaz, Grêmio Maringá, Uberaba 
 5 seasons: Colorado (PR), Itabaiana, Metropol (SC), Tiradentes (PI)
 4 seasons: Anapolina, Brasil de Pelotas, Caxias, Fluminense de Feira, Goiânia, Operário (MT), Piauí, Tuna Luso, Uberlândia, União São João
 3 seasons: Alecrim, CEUB, Cuiabá, Dom Bosco, Fast Clube, Ferroviário (PR), Fonseca, Leônico, Maranhão, Pinheiros (PR), Rabello, São Paulo (RS), Villa Nova (MG), Volta Redonda, XV de Piracicaba
 2 seasons: América (SP), Campo Grande (RJ), Capelense, Central, Comercial (SP), Galícia, Grêmio Barueri, Itabuna, Olaria, Santa Cruz (SE), Santo André, Santo Antônio (ES), São José (SP), XV de Jaú
 1 season: América (CE), América de Propriá, Anápolis, ASA, Auto Esporte (PB), Auto Esporte (PI), Brasiliense, Caldense, Catuense, AA Colatina, Comercial (PR), Corumbaense, Cruzeiro do Sul (DF), Defelê, Eletrovapo (RJ), Estrela do Mar (PB), Ferroviária, Ferroviário (MA), Francana, Guanabara (DF), Guará, Hercílio Luz, Inter de Lages, Inter de Santa Maria, Ipatinga, Itumbiara, J. Malucelli, Juventus (SP), AD Niterói, Noroeste, Novo Hamburgo, Olímpico (AM), Olímpico (SC), Operário Ferroviário, Paula Ramos, Perdigão, Potiguar de Mossoró, Rio Branco (RJ), São Bento, Siderúrgica, Sobradinho, Taguatinga, Vitória (ES)

All-time Campeonato Brasileiro table (1959–2019)

The All-time Campeonato Brasileiro table is an overall record of all match results, points, and goals of every team that has played in the Brazilian League since its inception in 1959. The table is accurate as of the end of the 2019 season. Teams in bold are part of the 2021 season.

Media coverage

Currently, the money of television represent a significant share in the finances of clubs in Brazil. The league broadcasting rights are total exclusivity of Grupo Globo, which distributes the live matches for its television stations: TV Globo (terrestrial and satellite), SporTV (pay), and the Premiere FC (through the system pay-per-view), where subscribers have the privilege to follow all 380 annual league matches. Globo, first cited, displays the League first time in 1987, when was created the Clube dos 13, trading tool of clubs with the television. The first television contract was negotiated in 1987, with only conveying the Green Module of the Copa União, organized by the Clube dos 13, the television rights were sold for $3.4 million to Rede Globo. And only with the conveying of the championship final, SBT broadcast the game instead, a blow to the Rede Globo, who says today that the Green Module would be the league itself, and then was prevented from entering the Ilha do Retiro. In 1990, only Rede Bandeirantes acquired the broadcast rights. This edition marked the first national title of Corinthians, second most popular team in the country. Both the final transmission, as the other games, attracted the attention of the public, causing the network to acquire an Ibope Rating of 53 points in the deciding game. This led to the Rede Globo prioritize the League from the next edition, in 1991.

In 1997, began to be restricted games live in cities where the matches are held (except finals). The Clube dos 13 closed the contract with Rede Globo's television rights as the holder of the Brasileirão for $50 million (including editions of 1998 and 1999), and resolves itself split the rights with Rede Bandeirantes during this period. It was the first edition to be shown on pay-per-view (via Premiere). In addition, the first games shown on pay television were courtesy of SporTV, after a controversial signing contract of Clube dos 13 with Globosat. Previously, in 1993, the Club of the 13 an CBF had signed a contract with TVA, a company in which ESPN Brazil was part. However, that decision was declined.

In 2000, the broadcasting rights of the Copa João Havelange, organized by the Clube dos 13, were sold to Rede Globo for $50 million. However, the final of this competition in 2001, was marked by an unusual situation. Vasco da Gama, a finalist against São Caetano, graced the logo of SBT, the second largest television station of Brazil, a direct rival to Globo. This situation was somewhat embarrassing for Globo, which transmitted the final exclusively, and which was seen by an estimated audience of 60 million people. Despite the large number of spectators in the final match, this edition was marked by low ratings, what did the Rede Globo to cancel the broadcast of a few matches.

In 2001, Clube dos 13 defines four divisions of transmission quota, with Corinthians, São Paulo, Palmeiras, Flamengo and Vasco in group 1, Santos in group 2, Fluminense, Botafogo, Atlético Mineiro, Cruzeiro, Internacional and Grêmio in group 3, and Bahia, Goiás, Sport Recife, Portuguesa, Coritiba, Athletico Paranaense, and Vitória in group 4. In 2003, the value was expanded by a considerable amount, for the first time surpassing the three digits, after the adoption of the new format of accrued points. The contract of $130 million per year was signed again by TV Globo. In 2005, C13 renews with Globo for the 2006–09 period in a deal worth $300 million.

In 2009, for the first time, the sale of broadcasting rights of the Brazilian Championship were made via open bidding. Media organisations were invited to bid for TV packages open, closed, PPV, internet and broadcast abroad. Rede Globo subsequently won the largest TV contract in the history of Brazilian football; $1.4 billion for 2009–2011.

In the early part of 2011, the majority of Clube dos 13 indicated they would be negotiating the 2012–2014 league rights independently.

In 2012, the final league rights amounts are uncertain. However, it is known that the clubs were divided into four groups: Group 1: Flamengo and Corinthians receiving 84 to 120 million reals; Group 2: São Paulo, Palmeiras, Santos and Vasco receiving 70 to 80 million reais; Group 3: Gremio, Cruzeiro, Atlético Mineiro VAR, Fluminense and Botafogo (45 to 55 million reais); Group 4: other first division clubs (18 to 30 million reais).

In 2013, SporTV made a deal with Fox Sports, giving up the rights of Campeonato Brasileiro in exchange for live coverage of the Copa Libertadores.

In 2016, Bandeirantes ended the partnership with Globo and ceased showing league matches, leaving Globo with exclusive rights. However, the channel of Turner Group, Esporte Interativo made a deal with Atlético-PR, Bahia, Ceará, Coritiba, Internacional, Joinville, Paysandu, Sampaio Corrêa, Santos, Criciúma, Fortaleza, Paraná, Ponte Preta and Santa Cruz for the broadcasting rights on cable television between 2019 and 2024, opposing Globo's SporTV channel. A decision on whether Palmeiras will be joining these teams is awaited.

In February 2021 the streaming service Paramount+ announced it will broadcast 350 matches

Flamengo and Corinthians, the two most supported teams in Brazil, receive approximately 25% (1/4) of all revenue from television. Flamengo has the biggest budget, (R$115.1 million), and Figueirense the smallest (R$18.5 million).

Match ball
Currently, the official match ball is provided by Nike. For the 2019 season, the CBF Merlin match ball is used.

Attendance

The audience of the Campeonato Brasileiro Série A is low if put into consideration the popularity of football in the country. Since the first data record, in 1967, each year the average attendance has fluctuated, more down than up, having the season of 1983 as the largest, averaging 22,953, and 2004 as the smallest, with a very low average of 7,556. The league is the second largest in attendance in South America, behind Argentina, with 18,817.

In comparison to other football league attendance, the Campeonato Brasileiro Série A figure only in fourteenth position, being overcome by the lower divisions in England and Germany. The smallest attendance ever was a game between Juventude and Portuguesa in 1997 with 55 fans, the largest was Flamengo and Santos in 1983 with 155,523.

The attendance of 2014 season was 16,337 with average occupation of 40%. In this same year, the average price of the ticket was $12.82, taking the games with an average income of $204,799.

The spectator figures for the league since 2009:

Players

Player records

Notes:
 All players are Brazilian unless otherwise noted,
 Italics denotes players still playing professional football, and bold denotes players still playing in the Brazilian Série A.
 Sources: Placar magazine - Guia do Brasileirão 2010 and GloboEsporte.com Website.

Awards and trophies
Prêmio Craque do Brasileirão is the league's official award. Placar magazine's Bola de Ouro is the oldest award, while the Troféu Osmar Santos and the Troféu João Saldanha are awards given by the newspaper Lance!.

See also
 Campeonato Brasileiro tournament scheduling, historical development of Campeonato Brasileiro from 1971 until today.
 Campeonato Brasileiro Série B, the second division of Brazilian football
 Campeonato Brasileiro Série C, the third division of Brazilian football
 Campeonato Brasileiro Série D, the fourth division of Brazilian football
 Campeonato Brasileiro Sub-20, the official U-20 national football tournament
 Campeonato Brasileiro de Seleções Estaduais, the tournament contested by state teams between 1922–1962 and in 1987.
 Torneio Rio-São Paulo, the inter-state competition between São Paulo and Rio de Janeiro, the two strongest football states at the era, held from 1950 to 1966, in 1993 and 1997 to 2002.
 Torneio Roberto Gomes Pedrosa, the national tournament from 1967 to 1970
 Copa do Brasil, the main knockout football competition of Brazilian football

References

External links

 

 Assista todos jogos Aqui
 CBF Confederação Brasileira de Futebol - Brazilian Football Confederation
 Brazil All-time topscorers
 RSSSF Brazil links
 zerozero.pt
 Futpedia The Brazilian Football Encyclopedia, with historical statistics about championships, clubs, games, athletes, and more (Portuguese).
 Champions Squads

Campeonato Brasileiro Série A
1
Sports leagues established in 1959
Sports leagues established in 1971
1
Brazil
Professional sports leagues in Brazil
Football